Cliff Jackson may refer to:

 Cliff Jackson (musician) (1902–1970), American jazz stride pianist
 Cliff Jackson (footballer) (1941–2018), English footballer
 Cliff Jackson (Canadian football) (born 1930s), Canadian football player
 Cliff Jackson (Bill Clinton critic), figure in Troopergate (1993)